"The Fabulous Faker Boy" is the twentieth episode of the twenty-fourth season of the American animated television series The Simpsons, and the 528th episode overall. It originally aired on the Fox network in the United States on May 12, 2013. Justin Bieber (as himself), Bill Hader, Jane Krakowski, and Patrick Stewart (as Vigorous Older Man) are credited as guest stars. The name is a pun on The Fabulous Baker Boys.

Plot
Marge attends a parent-principal conference with Principal Skinner, who tells her that Bart might be able to improve his academic performance by taking up a musical instrument. Marge takes Bart to several potential instructors - Sideshow Mel, Comic Book Guy, and Professor Frink - but he ridicules all of them. He becomes infatuated with a young Russian woman named Zhenya, who agrees to give him piano lessons in exchange for Marge teaching her father how to drive so that he can get a driver's license. While Marge makes little progress with Zhenya's father's dangerous habits, word of Bart's rapid progress and emerging musical ability quickly spreads, leading to Zhenya gaining many more students. However, it later emerges that he has only been miming in time with a CD that he has secretly slipped into a player mounted beneath the piano. Feeling neglected because Zhenya has very little time for him due to her other students, Bart publicly confesses to his deception during a talent show. Marge is enraged and disappointed in him until Zhenya's father tells her that he has obtained his license - not by passing the test, but by bribing Patty and Selma with jeans. He also convinces Marge to go easy on Bart as he only cheated for love and for his mother. Marge forgives Bart, saying she is proud of him for having told the truth and assuring him that he is unique and it will work out for him in the future.

Meanwhile, Homer loses the two last hairs on his head and becomes totally bald. He tries to hide it by using different hats and a wig, but these attempts only draw further attention to him. One worker at the power plant, who is also bald, inspires Homer with confidence by describing all the exciting experiences he has undergone since losing his hair. Homer tells Marge that he has gone bald; she comforts him, and the hairs spontaneously grow back. (Frédéric Chopin's "Polonaise in A-flat major, Op. 53" is played on piano during the closing credits.)

Reception

Critical reception
This episode received mixed reviews from critics. Robert David Sullivan of The A.V. Club gave the episode a C−, saying that "the relationship between Marge and Bart is actually one that hasn’t been done to death on The Simpsons, but it comes up too half-heartedly and is resolved too quickly in this episode."

Teresa Lopez of TV Fanatic gave the episode two and a half stars out of five, saying that "Not only was the mother-son dynamic shoved into the narrative late in the game, but Marge's disappointment was easily waived away by her Russian driving student saying Bart cheated for love and for his mother. Kind of a simple rationalization, right? The B-plot involving Homer's loss of his last two hairs did lead to some hilarious The Simpsons quotes and an amazing guest appearance by Patrick Stewart (I could see your belly), but it was mostly a distracting vehicle that allowed Homer to try on various hats."

Ratings
The episode received a 2.0 in the 18-49 demographic and was watched by a total of 4.16 million viewers. This made it the second-most watched show on Fox's Animation Domination line up that night.

References

External links 
 
 "The Fabulous Faker Boy"  at theSimpsons.com

The Simpsons (season 24) episodes
2013 American television episodes
Crossover animation
Robot Chicken